Panyaden International School is an international school for both preschool (nursery and kindergarten) primary and secondary children south of Chiang Mai (north Thailand). The school was founded to deliver a holistic education that integrates Buddhist principles and green awareness with the International Primary Curriculum (IPC). Panyaden School was certified as an international school using the British curriculum alongside the IPC in August 2016 and was authorised to offer International Baccalaureate Diploma Programme (IBDP) in 2021.

Panyaden International School is fully licensed by the Ministry of Education in Thailand and is also awarded accreditation by the Western Association of Schools and Colleges (WASC), a world-renowned accrediting association and one of the six regional accrediting agencies in the United States, which provide the accreditation to schools and colleges around the world. Accreditation is a confirmation that Panyaden offers excellent quality education for students in accordance with global standards. Additionally, this authentication validates the education Panyaden learners receive and assures that a Panyaden transcript means that each student received a valuable education from qualified staff. The curriculum offered at Panyaden includes International Baccalaureate Diploma Programme (IBDP), International Primary Curriculum (IPC), International Middle Years Curriculum (IMYC). In order to maintain our accreditation, we regularly partake in evaluation visits. These visits ensure that the high quality Panyaden education remains consistent.

Curriculum

Panyaden International School is registered with the Thai Ministry of Education Its curriculum is taught in both Thai (50 percent) and English (50 percent) from nursery to Year 9 (Secondary school). Each class has a Thai teacher and fluent English-speaking teacher.

Kindergarten
The kindergarten curriculum focuses on the development of four areas: physical, emotional, moral/social, and intellectual through activity and play-based learning.

Primary
The primary school curriculum integrates Buddhist principles and green awareness with the International Primary Curriculum (IPC) which emphasizes learning through experience, within the National Curriculum for England framework developing enquiring minds and independent thinking.

Secondary
The International Middle Years Curriculum (IMYC) for Secondary Curriculum (Year 7 to Year 11) and  International Baccalaureate Diploma Programme  (Year 12-13). We add to this the teaching of core Buddhist values and a strong focus on environmental awareness. 
In a nutshell, we are a value-based and green international school. Both the IPC and IMYC are built around a thematic approach that is student-centred and focuses on a hands-on discovery approach that optimizes students’ participation in order to create a rich and enjoyable learning experience. Everything we do prepares our students to become lifelong learners who will strive to do their best and enjoy the effort put into their work as much as the positive results this is bound to yield. 

The school uses a subject integration approach that supports a deeper understanding of each subject and the natural interconnectivity between them. It stimulates the ability to look at situations and problems from different angles. Additional "life skills" classes cover topics such as valuing nature, healthy eating, and respect for others and give opportunities to practise core subjects through a variety of methods and activities.

Teaching staff
The staff consists of 19 nationalities.

Architecture
The school is an example for eco-friendly architecture and as such it has received both local as well as international recognition. The buildings that make up the school fall into two categories. The classrooms and offices were built with load bearing walls made of rammed earth which carry bamboo roofs, cladding as well as structural elements. Due to the high thermal mass of rammed earth walls, temperature variations are moderated, thus eliminating the need for air conditioning. In addition, rammed earth walls keep humidity at specific levels which are ideal for asthma sufferers. The several open pavilions (which are called sala in Thai) that house the assembly hall, the Buddhist chapel, the school canteen, and a covered play area next to the swimming pool, are completely made out of bamboo, also using bamboo set on large boulders of natural stone for the structural supports. 24H Architecture from the Netherlands was responsible for the initial design. with the construction and subsequent designs of additional buildings by Chiangmai Life Construction.

Also in adherence to the concepts behind sustainable architecture, waste water is treated before its re-entry into the environment, and food waste is recycled to produce biogas for cooking in the school kitchen, and as organic fertilizer for use on the school grounds. To minimise the need for artificial lighting, skylights are incorporated into the roofs of the buildings.

See also

 Education in Thailand
 Chiang Mai
 List of international schools in Thailand
 Bilingual education - Southeast Asia (Thailand, Malaysia)

Further reading
 Hirsh-Pasek, K., Golinkoff, R.M., Berk, L.E. & Singer, D.G. (2009). A Mandate for Playful Learning in Preschool: Presenting the Evidence. New York: Oxford University Press.

References

External links

 Official website
 Chiang Mai Mail: Interview with school director Neil Amas

Bilingual schools
Private schools in Thailand
International schools in Thailand
Buddhist schools
Bamboo buildings and structures
Rammed earth buildings and structures
Education in Chiang Mai
Sustainable buildings and structures
Educational institutions established in 2011
2011 establishments in Thailand